Lemyethna or Laymyethna Township is a township of Hinthada District in the Ayeyarwady Division of Myanmar.

See also
List of villages in Lemyethna Township

Townships of Ayeyarwady Region